Josiah Didier (born April 8, 1993) is an American professional ice hockey defenseman currently playing for Providence Bruins of the American Hockey League (AHL). He was selected in the fourth round, 97th overall, by the Montreal Canadiens in the 2011 NHL Entry Draft.

Playing career
Didier played collegiate hockey with the University of Denver in the National Collegiate Hockey Conference. Following the completion of his four-year tenure with the Pioneers, Didier un-signed from the Montreal Canadiens and agreed to an AHL PTO contract with affiliate, the Hamilton Bulldogs, to end the 2014–15 season on March 31, 2015.

He continued within the Canadiens organization in signing an AHL contract for the 2015–16 season with new AHL affiliate, the St. John's IceCaps on June 8, 2015.

Following two full season with the Charlotte Checkers, culminating in a Calder Cup championship in the 2018–19 season, he was signed as a free agent by the Providence Bruins on July 1, 2019.

In the 2019–20 season, Didier recorded career bests mark with 12 goals and 15 points through 61 regular season games, leading the AHL in Plus/minus with +32. He was signed to a two-year contract extension with Providence on January 31, 2020.

On January 1, 2022, Didier was announced as the 26th captain of the Providence Bruins.

Career statistics

Awards and honors

References

External links

1993 births
Living people
American men's ice hockey defensemen
Brampton Beast players
Cedar Rapids RoughRiders players
Charlotte Checkers (2010–) players
Denver Pioneers men's ice hockey players
Florida Everblades players
Hamilton Bulldogs (AHL) players
Montreal Canadiens draft picks
Providence Bruins players
St. John's IceCaps players